Club Deportivo Independiente Miraflores (sometimes referred as DIM) is a Peruvian football club, playing in the city of Miraflores, Lima, Peru.

History
The Club Atlético Independiente was founded on August 30, 1983.

In the 2009 Copa Perú, the club classified to the National Stage, but was eliminated by Tecnológico in the Quarterfinals.

In the 2011 Copa Perú, the club classified to the Departamental Stage, but was eliminated by Pacífico in the Semifinals.

In the 2015 Copa Perú, the club classified to the National Stage, but was eliminated by La Bocana in the Quarterfinals.

In the 2016 Copa Perú, the club classified to the National Stage, but was eliminated by Octavio Espinosa in the Repechage.

In the 2019 Copa Perú, the club classified to the National Stage, but was eliminated by Deportivo Llacuabamba in the Round of 32.

In the 2021 Copa Perú, the club classified to the National Stage, but was eliminated by Maristas in the Fase 1 - Regional.

In the 2022 Copa Perú, the club classified to the Provincial Stage, but was eliminated in the Group Stage.

Honours

Regional
Región IV:
Winners (1): 2009

Liga Departamental de Lima:
Winners (1): 2015
Runner-up (3): 2009, 2016, 2019

Liga Provincial de Lima:
Winners (4): 2009, 2013, 2015, 2019
Runner-up (2): 2011, 2012

Liga Distrital de Miraflores:
Winners (12): 2006, 2007, 2009, 2011, 2012, 2013, 2014, 2015, 2017, 2018, 2019, 2022
Runner-up (1): 2008

See also
List of football clubs in Peru
Peruvian football league system

References

External links

Deportivo Independiente Miraflores 2015
Datos DIM 2016

Football clubs in Peru
Association football clubs established in 1983